Jean Rouse Preston (May 25, 1935 – January 10, 2013) served for 20 years in the North Carolina General Assembly, including seven terms in the North Carolina House of Representatives and three in the North Carolina Senate. She retired in 2012 when she was the Joint Republican Caucus Leader and Senator representing the state's second district, including constituents in Carteret county. She also served as co-chair of the Education/Higher Education and the Appropriations Education/Higher Education Committees.  She was a retired educator from Emerald Isle, North Carolina. Preston died in 2013 at age 77.

Early life and education
Preston was born on May 25, 1935, in Snow Hill, North Carolina. Her parents were Marvin Wayne Rouse and the former Emma
Mae Kearney. She graduated from Snow Hill High School in 1953 and then attended Flora MacDonald College for a couple of years before graduating with a B.S. degree and in Business Education from East Carolina University in 1957. She later returned to ECU to receive her M.A. in Education in 1973.

References

External links
 

|-

|-

1935 births
2013 deaths
Republican Party members of the North Carolina House of Representatives
Republican Party North Carolina state senators
People from Snow Hill, North Carolina
People from Emerald Isle, North Carolina
Women state legislators in North Carolina
Accidental deaths from falls
Accidental deaths in North Carolina
21st-century American politicians
21st-century American women politicians